Robert Cecil "Bob" Erwin (December 29, 1934 – January 24, 2020) was an American lawyer who served as a justice of the Supreme Court of Alaska from August 3, 1970, to April 15, 1977.

Born in Seward, Alaska, Erwin was the younger brother of William Matthews Erwin, who would later be elected to represent the eastern Kenai Peninsula in the 1st and 2nd state legislatures. Erwin was a state prosecutor for the Nome area in the 1960s. He took the Alaska state bar examination in July 1960, in order to be able to practice in the state courts. As a prosecutor, he handled cases as mundane as failure to pay state school taxes, and as exotic as unlicensed polar bear hunting.

Erwin was appointed to the court by Governor Keith Harvey Miller, and was only the second democrat to be appointed. Erwin was the only Alaskan-born justice until the 2007 appointment of Daniel Winfree. After seven years on the court, Erwin resigned, stating, "this is a crazy job and you sure can't help people from here". He returned to private practice in Anchorage, noting that as a private attorney he would be "able to take public stands" on political issues.

From 2002 to 2003, Erwin served as the only Catholic member of a panel convened to investigate and report on sexual abuse of minors by the Catholic Church in Alaska.

References

1934 births
2020 deaths
Justices of the Alaska Supreme Court
People from Kenai Peninsula Borough, Alaska
People from Nome, Alaska
People from Seward, Alaska